Mimovitalisia is a genus of longhorn beetles of the subfamily Lamiinae, containing the following species:

 Mimovitalisia tuberculata (Pic, 1924)
 Mimovitalisia wittmeri Breuning, 1975

References

Desmiphorini